Vanier is a former provincial electoral district located in the Capitale-Nationale region of Quebec, Canada, which elected members to the National Assembly of Quebec. As of its final election, it included mostly western and central portions of Quebec City west of Quebec Autoroute 73.

It was created for the 1973 election from parts of the riding of Saint-Sauveur.  Its final election was in 2008.  It disappeared in the 2012 election and the successor electoral district was Vanier-Les Rivières.

Members of the National Assembly

Election results

|-
 
|Liberal
|Patrick Huot
|align="right"|13,077
|align="right"|38.33
|align="right"| +14.14

|}

|-
 
|Liberal
|Jean-Claude L'Abbée
|align="right"|9,733
|align="right"|24.19
|align="right"|

|-

|-

|}

References

External links
Information
 Elections Quebec

Election results
 Election results (National Assembly)
 Election results (Elections Quebec)

Maps
 2001 map (Flash)
2001–2011 changes (Flash)
1992–2001 changes (Flash)
 Electoral map of Capitale-Nationale region (as of 2001)
 Quebec electoral map, 2001

Former provincial electoral districts of Quebec